Paul Wojciech Juda (born July 7, 2001) is an American artistic gymnast.  He is currently competing for the Michigan Wolverines in NCAA gymnastics and is a member of the U.S. men's national team.

Personal life 
Juda was born in Deerfield, Illinois to Ewa Bacher and Jozef Juda. He attended Stevenson High School in Lincolnshire, Illinois.

Gymnastics career

Junior

2016–17
Juda competed at the 2016 Junior Olympic National Championships, where he won gold on floor exercise, and silver on parallel bars and high bar. In May 2017, he competed at the 2017 Junior Olympic National Championships where he won gold in the all-around. In August 2017, he competed at the 2017 U.S. National Gymnastics Championships in the junior division, where he won a silver medal in the all-around and on still rings and parallel bars.

2018–19
He competed at the 2018 Winter Cup in the junior division, where he won gold on floor exercise and silver on still rings and parallel bars. In August 2018, he competed at the 2018 U.S. National Gymnastics Championships at the junior division, where he won gold on still rings, sixth on pommel horse, and sixth on floor exercise. In August 2019, he competed at the 2019 U.S. National Gymnastics Championships, where he won bronze on horizontal bar, and compiled a score of 159.850 to place 13th. Following his performance at the competition, he was named to the United States men's national junior gymnastics team.

Senior

2020
In February 2020, he competed at the 2020 Winter Cup, where he won bronze on horizontal bars, tied for fifth on floor exercise, and eighth in all-around (81.650). Following his outstanding performance at the Winter Cup, he was named to the United States men's national gymnastics team. At just 19 years old, he became the national team's youngest member. 

In November 2020, he competed at the 2020 Friendship and Solidarity Competition where he won a gold medal with Team Solidarity. On individual events, he scored a 14.40 on vault, a 13.80 on floor exercise, a 13.40 on pommel horse, a 13.00 on still rings, a 13.20 on parallel bars and an 11.50 on high bar. The event served as Juda's first senior-level international competition.

Juda began competing for the Michigan Wolverines men's gymnastics team in 2020. During a season that was shortened due to the COVID-19 pandemic, he was named Big Ten Gymnast of the Week once, Big Ten Freshman of the Week twice and CGA Gymnast of the Week and CGA Gymnast Freshman of the Week once. He recorded a 15.000 on high bar for his season high, the third-highest score in the NCAA. He captured eight individual event titles, including three on high bar, and earned CGA All-America honors on high bar after leading the nation with an average score of 14.083. He finished the season ranked No. 6 in the NCAA in the all-around with an average of 79.750. Following the season, he was named Big Ten Conference Freshman of the Year.

2021
In February 2021, he competed at the 2021 Winter Cup, where he finished fourth on parallel bars with a score of 13.900, and sixth in the all-around with a score of 79.850.

During the 2021 NCAA season, he captured 13 event titles and was the top-ranked all-around gymnast in the country, with a national qualifying average of 86.167. He was also ranked No. 1 nationally on high bar (14.367), No. 1 in the Big Ten on parallel bars (14.617), and second in the league on floor exercise (14.533), still rings (14.300) and pommel horse (14.250). He helped Michigan advance to the 2021 NCAA Men's Gymnastics Championship, where he won silver on pommel horse and helped the team win bronze. Following the season, he was named Big Ten Conference Gymnast of the Year and CGA National MVP.

In June 2021, he competed at the 2021 Pan American Gymnastics Championships, where he won silver in the all-around with a score of 83.000. As a result, he qualified to compete at the Olympic Trials.

2022
In March 2022, he competed at the Cairo World Cup, where he won silver on the floor exercise and horizontal bar.

During the 2022 NCAA season, he won 11 event titles, was named Big Ten Gymnast of the Week twice. He led the conference on parallel bars (14.080 average, 14.800 high score) and high bar (14.258 average, 14.500 high score). His season-best all-around score of 86.100 was the top score of any Big Ten all-arounder. Following the season he was again named Big Ten Gymnast of the Year, joining Sam Mikulak as the only Michigan gymnast to win the award multiple times. During the 2022 Big Ten Tournament Championship, he won the all-around competition with a cumulative score of 85.350. He won a title on high bar, scoring a 14.500. The high bar win by Juda was the 15th in program history and the first since Sam Mikulak in 2013. He was also named Big Ten Gymnast of the Championships. 

During the 2022 NCAA Men's Gymnastics Championship, Juda won the all-around with an 85.298, and vault individual titles, and helped Michigan place third in the team competition with a season-best 414.490. He also placed second on high bar, fourth on parallel bars and eighth on both floor exercise and still rings. He tied Mikulak's modern-era school record of six All-America honors.

Competitive history

References

External links
 

2001 births
Living people
People from Deerfield, Illinois
American male artistic gymnasts
Michigan Wolverines men's gymnasts